The 2018 NBA Finals was the championship series of the National Basketball Association's (NBA) 2017–18 season and conclusion of the season's playoffs. In this best-of-seven playoff, the defending NBA champion and Western Conference champion Golden State Warriors swept the defending Eastern Conference champion Cleveland Cavaliers four games to zero. The Warriors became the 7th NBA franchise to win back-to-back championships, joining the Los Angeles Lakers, Boston Celtics, Detroit Pistons, Chicago Bulls, Houston Rockets, and Miami Heat.  This year's Finals was the first time in any of North America's four major professional sports leagues that the same two teams met for the championship four years in a row. This was also the first time that a team was swept in the NBA Finals since 2007, in which the Cavaliers were also the losing team. LeBron James, in his eighth consecutive NBA Finals appearance and ninth appearance overall, suffered the second Finals sweep of his career, having also played in the 2007 Finals. Warriors small forward Kevin Durant was named NBA Finals MVP for the second straight year.

Entering the matchup, the Warriors were also noted by various sports media outlets as one of the biggest NBA Finals favorites in recent history. The 2018 Finals began on May 31 and ended on June 8. The series broke the record set by the 2014 NBA Finals for highest average scoring differential per game (15.0) for an NBA Finals series.

Background

Cleveland Cavaliers

This was the Cleveland Cavaliers' fourth consecutive trip to the NBA Finals, and fifth appearance overall. This was also the eighth consecutive NBA Finals appearance for Cavaliers small forward LeBron James.

Prior to the 2017–18 season, All-Star point guard Kyrie Irving requested to be traded away from the Cavaliers. Although James was against the idea of trading him away, the Cavaliers agreed to Irving's request, trading him to the Boston Celtics in exchange for point guard Isaiah Thomas, small forward Jae Crowder, center Ante Žižić, the first round pick from the Brooklyn Nets in the 2018 NBA Draft and the Miami Heat's 2020 second round pick. Miami's second round pick was added as compensation after Isaiah Thomas failed his physical. Other major changes included shooting guard Dwyane Wade signing with the Cavaliers, thus reuniting with James from their time together on the Big Three-era Miami Heat, and the signing of point guard Derrick Rose to a one-year contract.

On February 8, 2018 – just before the NBA trade deadline – the Cavaliers radically changed their roster in a little more than an hour, acquiring George Hill, Rodney Hood, Jordan Clarkson, and Larry Nance Jr. in exchange for Thomas, Rose, Crowder, Wade, Channing Frye, Iman Shumpert, and their own 2018 first-round pick. Multiple writers argued at the time that the trades made the Cavaliers significantly better.

The Cavaliers finished the regular season with a 50–32 record, securing the 4th seed in the Eastern Conference. In the playoffs, the Cavaliers defeated the Indiana Pacers in seven games in the first round, swept the top-seeded Toronto Raptors in the Eastern Conference semifinals, and defeated the Boston Celtics in seven games in the Eastern Conference Finals.

Golden State Warriors

This was the Golden State Warriors' fourth consecutive trip to the NBA Finals. During the 2017–18 offseason, the Warriors re-signed their core players, including point guard Stephen Curry to a five-year contract worth $201 million, and Kevin Durant to a two-year, $53 million contract. Golden State also re-signed Andre Iguodala, Shaun Livingston, Zaza Pachulia, and David West. A major free agent acquired during the offseason was guard Nick Young.

The Warriors finished the 2017–18 regular season with a 58–24 record, winning the Pacific Division and securing the 2nd seed in the Western Conference. In the playoffs, Golden State defeated the San Antonio Spurs in five games in the first round, eliminated the New Orleans Pelicans in five games in the Western Conference semifinals, and defeated the top-seeded Houston Rockets in seven games in the Western Conference Finals.

The Warriors entered the series as heavy favorites, aiming to repeat back-to-back titles after losing their quest in 2016.

Road to the Finals

Regular season series
The Warriors won the regular season series 2–0.

Series summary

Game summaries
All times are in Eastern Daylight Time (UTC−4)

Game 1

Klay Thompson of the Warriors suffered a leg injury in the first quarter, but returned to the game in the second quarter. With the score tied at 107 in the last five seconds of regulation, J. R. Smith of the Cavaliers collected an offensive rebound following a missed free throw, but dribbled the ball towards half court rather than taking a final shot. Tyronn Lue, Cleveland's coach, later said that Smith thought the Cavaliers were ahead, though Smith denied not knowing the correct score, and claimed he assumed his team would take a time-out. Cleveland was not able to score in the final seconds and the game went to overtime. In overtime, the Warriors outscored the Cavaliers 17–7 to win the game. Tristan Thompson was ejected following a flagrant foul with 2.6 seconds remaining in overtime.

Cleveland's LeBron James scored 51 points in Game 1, the sixth-highest point total for an NBA Finals game and the most in a loss. After Game 1, James punched a whiteboard in the Cavaliers' locker room due to frustration of his team's level of play, suffering a bone contusion in his hand that he kept private for the remainder of the series.

Game 2

The Warriors employed more double teams against James in Game 2, limiting him to 29 points. Cleveland had a 41% field goal percentage, including 9-for-27 (33.3%) on three-point field goals. Meanwhile, Golden State's Stephen Curry set an NBA Finals record in Game 2 with nine three-point field goals. He scored 33 points, while the Warriors got 26 points, nine rebounds, and seven assists from Kevin Durant, and 20 points from Klay Thompson. Smith struggled for Cleveland, shooting 2-for-9 (22.2%) with both baskets coming in the first quarter. The Warriors won 122–103 over the Cavaliers.

Game 3

Andre Iguodala of the Warriors, who missed the previous six games, including the first two games of the NBA Finals, due to a left leg injury, returned in Game 3. He injured his right leg early in the game, not returning until after halftime. The Cavaliers started the game with a 14–4 advantage and led for the entire first half, at one point leading by 13. The Warriors trimmed Cleveland's lead to six by halftime. The Cavaliers enjoyed strong contributions from Rodney Hood, who scored 15 points, Smith, who scored 13 points, and Kevin Love, who had 20 points and 13 rebounds.

Durant, who reprised his dagger 3-pointer over LeBron James from Game 3 the previous year with 49.8 seconds left to give the Warriors a 106-100 lead, scored a playoff career-high 43 points, while also contributing 13 rebounds and seven assists, in a 110–102 win over the Cavaliers, helping the Warriors take a 3–0 lead. Golden State withstood poor offensive performances from Curry and Klay Thompson, the Splash Brothers. Curry missed 13 out of his first 14 shot attempts in the game. The Cavaliers were 3-for-17 (17.6%) on three point shots in the second half, and Durant scored a three-pointer late in the game that ended Cleveland's chances of a comeback. With the 110–102 victory, the Warriors took a 3–0 series lead.

Game 4

The Warriors led the game nearly from start to finish. Golden State led 13–3 at the start of the game. Though the Cavaliers took the lead, 39–38, in the second quarter, the Warriors led 61–52 at halftime. The Warriors expanded their lead in the third quarter and entered the last period of play with an 86–65 advantage.

With Golden State leading 102–77 with 4:03 remaining, James came out of the game, receiving a standing ovation. Curry scored 37 points and made seven three-pointers, while Durant recorded a triple-double with 20 points, 12 rebounds and 10 assists. The Warriors won 108–85 to sweep the series. Durant was named Finals MVP for the second straight year. He received seven of the 11 votes, with Curry receiving the other four.

Game 4 was also James' last game as a Cavalier as he joined the Los Angeles Lakers during the offseason.

The Warriors' victory parade took place on June 12 in Downtown Oakland.

Rosters

Cleveland Cavaliers

Golden State Warriors

Player statistics

Golden State Warriors

|-! style="background:#FDE910;"
! scope="row" style="text-align:left; background:#FDE910"| 
| 4 || 4 || 41.3 || .526 || .409 || .963 || 10.8 || 7.5 || 0.8 || 2.3 || 28.8
|-
! scope="row" style="text-align:left;"| 
| 4 || 4 || 40.6 || .402 || .415 || 1.000 || 6.0 || 6.8 || 1.5 || 0.8 || 27.5
|-
! scope="row" style="text-align:left;"| 
| 4 || 4 || 37.0 || .480 || .429 || .800 || 3.8 || 1.0 || 0.5 || 0.3 || 16.0
|-
! scope="row" style="text-align:left;"| 
| 4 || 4 || 41.4 || .517 || .214 || .800 || 6.0 || 8.5 || 2.0 || 1.5 || 9.3
|-
! scope="row" style="text-align:left;"| 
| 4 || 3 || 13.8 || .800 || .000 || .000 || 2.3 || 0.0 || 0.0 || 1.3 || 8.0
|-
! scope="row" style="text-align:left;"| 
| 4 || 0 || 16.2 || .867 || .000 || 1.000 || 2.8 || 1.5 || 0.3 || 0.0 || 7.5
|-
! scope="row" style="text-align:left;"| 
| 4 || 0 || 13.5 || .714 || .000 || .500 || 3.3 || 1.0 || 0.3 || 0.5 || 5.8
|-
! scope="row" style="text-align:left;"| 
| 2 || 0 || 22.3 || .583 || .500 || 1.000 || 2.0 || 0.5 || 1.5 || 1.0 || 9.5
|-
! scope="row" style="text-align:left;"| 
| 4 || 1 || 9.7 || .714 || .000 || .000 || 1.5 || 0.3 || 0.3 || 0.0 || 2.5
|-
! scope="row" style="text-align:left;"| 
| 2 || 0 || 3.1 || .333 || .000 || 1.000 || 1.5 || 0.0 || 0.0 || 0.5 || 4.0
|-
! scope="row" style="text-align:left;"| 
| 4 || 0 || 7.0 || .600 || 1.000 || .000 || 1.3 || 1.0 || 0.0 || 0.8 || 1.8
|-
! scope="row" style="text-align:left;"| 
| 2 || 0 || 1.8 || .333 || .000 || .000 || 0.0 || 0.0 || 0.0 || 0.0 || 1.0
|-
! scope="row" style="text-align:left;"| 
| 4 || 0 || 9.5 || .154 || .100 || .000 || 0.5 || 0.0 || 0.0 || 0.0 || 1.3
|-
! scope="row" style="text-align:left;"| 
| 4 || 0 || 2.7 || .000 || .000 || 1.000 || 0.3 || 0.0 || 0.3 || 0.0 || 0.5

Cleveland Cavaliers

|-
! scope="row" style="text-align:left;"| 
| 4 || 4 || 44.7 || .527 || .333 || .842 || 8.5 || 10.0 || 1.3 || 1.0 || 34.0
|-
! scope="row" style="text-align:left;"| 
| 4 || 4 || 33.2 || .406 || .321 || .938 || 11.3 || 1.8 || 1.0 || 0.3 || 19.0
|-
! scope="row" style="text-align:left;"| 
| 4 || 4 || 32.5 || .317 || .360 || .600 || 3.3 || 1.3 || 1.3 || 0.0 || 9.5
|-
! scope="row" style="text-align:left;"| 
| 4 || 4 || 29.2 || .323 || .438 || .500 || 2.3 || 2.3 || 0.8 || 0.3 || 7.5
|-
! scope="row" style="text-align:left;"| 
| 4 || 4 || 23.4 || .520 || .000 || .333 || 5.3 || 0.0 || 0.0 || 0.8 || 6.8
|-
! scope="row" style="text-align:left;"| 
| 4 || 0 || 14.1 || .444 || .200 || .667 || 3.8 || 0.8 || 0.5 || 0.5 || 6.8
|-
! scope="row" style="text-align:left;"| 
| 4 || 0 || 17.1 || .500 || .000 || .417 || 7.0 || 1.5 || 0.5 || 0.5 || 5.8
|-
! scope="row" style="text-align:left;"| 
| 4 || 0 || 24.4 || .286 || .214 || 1.000 || 1.3 || 2.0 || 0.3 || 0.3 || 5.3
|-
! scope="row" style="text-align:left;"| 
| 2 || 0 || 12.6 || .231 || .000 || .000 || 2.0 || 0.5 || 1.0 || 0.5 || 3.0
|-
! scope="row" style="text-align:left;"| 
| 4 || 0 || 16.2 || .063 || .091 || .600 || 1.8 || 0.8 || 0.0 || 0.3 || 1.5
|-
! scope="row" style="text-align:left;"| 
| 3 || 0 || 1.7 || 1.000 || .000 || .000 || 0.3 || 0.0 || 0.0 || 0.0 || 2.0
|-
! scope="row" style="text-align:left;"| 
| 3 || 0 || 2.5 || .500 || .000 || .000 || 1.0 || 0.7 || 0.3 || 0.0 || 1.3
|-
! scope="row" style="text-align:left;"| 
| 3 || 0 || 2.8 || .400 || .000 || .000 || 0.3 || 0.0 || 0.0 || 0.0 || 1.3

Sponsorship
For the first time, the NBA sold a presenting sponsorship for the Finals to the internet television service YouTube TV. YouTube TV had previously been the presenting sponsor for the 2017 World Series, the first time that Major League Baseball's championship series had a title sponsor as well. As part of a multi-year partnership deal, YouTube TV also broadcast the NBA Finals.

Broadcast
In the United States, the NBA Finals aired on ABC with Mike Breen as play-by-play commentator, and Jeff Van Gundy and Mark Jackson serving as color commentators. The series was sponsored by YouTube TV. ESPN Radio aired it as well and had Marc Kestecher and Hubie Brown as commentators. ESPN Deportes provided exclusive Spanish-language coverage of The Finals, with a commentary team of Álvaro Martín and Carlos Morales.

Aftermath

James left the Cavaliers in the 2018 offseason to join the Los Angeles Lakers. As of the 2021-22 NBA season, the Cavaliers have failed to return to the playoffs after James' departure, as was the case the first time he left them to join the Miami Heat; however, they entered the postseason—for the first time as a non-LeBron team since 1998—in the play-in, losing to both the Brooklyn Nets and the Atlanta Hawks.

See also

Death Lineup
Cavaliers–Warriors rivalry

References

External links
Official website
2018 NBA Finals at Basketball-Reference.com

Finals
National Basketball Association Finals
NBA Finals
NBA Finals
NBA
NBA
NBA Finals
NBA Finals
2010s in Cleveland
2010s in Oakland, California
Basketball competitions in Cleveland
Basketball competitions in Oakland, California
ABS-CBN television specials